Hartmann I  (1160–1240) was the Count of Württemberg. 

Hartmann I and his brother Ludwig III both called themselves “Count of Württemberg” at the time, so it is assumed that they administered the county together. They were both sons of Count Ludwig II. Hartmann accompanied Otto IV to Rome for his coronation as Holy Roman Emperor and served repeatedly as a witness in documents set up by the emperor in Italy. After the election of Frederick II of Swabia as king and emperor, Hartmann and his brother switched their support to Frederick and later supported his eventual successor Henry VII. 

Around 1200, Hartmann married the heiress to the county of Veringen in Upper Swabia, thus acquiring lands including Altshausen, Burg Alt-Veringen and the county of eastern Apphagaues.

This article is translated (poorly) from that on the German Wikipedia

1160 births
1240 deaths
12th-century counts of Württemberg
13th-century counts of Württemberg